The Eugene Saint Julien Cox House, now known as the E. St. Julien Cox House, is a Carpenter Gothic-style house in St. Peter, Minnesota, United States. It was built in 1871 for Eugene Saint Julien Cox, the first mayor of St. Peter, and his family. It was listed on the National Register of Historic Places on November 20, 1970.

The building has been restored inside and out to its late 19th-century appearance by the Nicollet County Historical Society, which opens it as a house museum a few days per week during the summer.

References

External links
 
 Nicollet County Historical Society: E. St. Julien Cox House
 National Register of Historic Places - Eugene Saint Julien Cox House, Minnesota Historical Society

Carpenter Gothic architecture in Minnesota
Historic house museums in Minnesota
Houses on the National Register of Historic Places in Minnesota
Museums in Nicollet County, Minnesota
Carpenter Gothic houses in the United States
Houses in Nicollet County, Minnesota
National Register of Historic Places in Nicollet County, Minnesota